Séamus Mac Cathmhaoil aka James MacCawell was the first Anglican Archbishop of Cashel.

He was nominated on 12 February 1567  and appointed by letters patent on 2 October that year. He died in office in 1570.

References

16th-century Anglican bishops in Ireland
Anglican archbishops of Cashel
1570 deaths
Irish Anglican archbishops